Sazlıdere may refer to several places in Turkey:

 Sazlıdere, Edirne
 Sazlıdere, Keşan
 Sazlıdere Dam